WZTA (1370 AM) is a commercial radio station in Vero Beach, Florida. The station serves the Treasure Coast area and is owned by iHeartMedia, Inc. WZTA broadcasts an oldies radio format, and is known on air as "Oldies 107.9 and 1370."

Programming on WZTA is also heard on FM translator W300BQ at 107.9 MHz.

History
On October 24, 1954, the station signed on as WNTM. It originally was a daytimer, required to leave the air at sunset every night. It was owned by Central Florida Broadcasting and had a power of 1,000 watts, days only. It was a rare station in that era to have a female president, Naomi T. Murrell. WNTM was a network affiliate of the Mutual Broadcasting System (MBS).

The station later changed its call sign to WAXE.

Until July 2, 2020, WZTA had broadcast a talk radio format and carried syndicated programming from Premiere Networks and Fox News Radio. During evening and overnight hours from 7 pm to 5 am, the station played Adult Standards music.

References

External links

ZTA
Radio stations established in 1979
1979 establishments in Florida
IHeartMedia radio stations
Oldies radio stations in the United States